DeShawn Stevenson (born April 3, 1981) is an American former professional basketball player. Stevenson played for six teams in the National Basketball Association (NBA) during a 13-year career. He originally committed to play at the University of Kansas, but decided to enter the NBA directly from high school and was picked by the Utah Jazz with the 23rd selection of the 2000 NBA draft. He was a member of the Dallas Mavericks team that won an NBA championship in 2011. In 2017, Stevenson joined Power, one of the eight BIG3 basketball league teams.

Early life
Stevenson was born in Fresno, California. His father, Darryl Stevenson, never married his mother Genice Popps, and eventually was forcibly placed in a facility after threatening family members and diagnosed as schizophrenic. Darryl signed a court order agreeing he had a duty to support his son, but eventually murdered his own mother Clara by strangling her; he died of cancer at the age of 36 in prison. DeShawn's name was tattooed on his chest. Due to the absence of his father, DeShawn lived with his godparents in Easton, California. He played high school ball at the same school where his father had played, and won a state championship his junior year.

Stevenson signed with the Kansas Jayhawks in the fall of his senior year. Jayhawks head coach Roy Williams called him his "most gifted recruit ever". As a senior, Stevenson averaged 30.4 points, 9.7 rebounds and 6.2 assists a game. He was named to the McDonald's All-American team and scored 25 points to lead the West to a 146–120 win, and won the slam-dunk contest. Stevenson's mother advised him not to go straight to the NBA, but after there were irregularities with his SAT test, Stevenson did indeed enter the league straight out of high school.

NBA career

Utah Jazz (2000–2004) 
Stevenson was picked by the Utah Jazz with the 23rd selection of the 2000 NBA draft.

Stevenson appeared in 222 regular season games during his time with Utah.  He averaged 5.9 ppg, 1.9 rpg, and 1.2 apg, in 16.7 mpg during that time. Stevenson played in five career playoff outings. At 19 years old, he became the youngest player to ever play and start for the Jazz during the 2000–01 season.  In 2001, Stevenson finished second in the NBA Slam Dunk Contest. Later that year, Stevenson pleaded no contest to having sex with a 14-year-old girl.

On March 16, 2003, Stevenson received widespread attention for shoving Ricky Davis of the Cleveland Cavaliers after Davis deliberately missed a shot on his own basket in an attempt to record a triple-double, when the Cavaliers were up 120–95. On November 1, 2003, Stevenson scored a then-career-high 24 points in a loss against the Mavericks.

On February 19, 2004,  Stevenson and a future second round draft pick were acquired by the Orlando Magic from the Utah Jazz in exchange for guard–forward Gordan Giricek.

Orlando Magic (2004–2006) 
Stevenson played with the Orlando Magic for 2½ seasons.  He had his best year during the 2005–06 season when he averaged 11.0 ppg, 2.9 rpg, and 2.0 apg.  Stevenson opted out of the third and final year of his contract with Orlando, and on August 5, 2006 he signed a two-year minimum contract with the Washington Wizards.

Washington Wizards (2006–2010) 

On August 5, 2006, Stevenson signed a two-year contract with the Washington Wizards for the NBA minimum salary. Stevenson quickly adjusted to coach Eddie Jordan's system, averaging 11.2 ppg, 2.7 rpg, and 2.7 apg in his first season with Washington. Following the 2006–07 season, he opted out of the second year of his contract to test free agency. On July 16, 2007, Stevenson re-signed with the Wizards on a four-year, $15 million deal.

On the early morning of August 20, 2007, a 31-year-old man, Curtis Ruff, was shot and injured at Stevenson's home, following an argument with women who were invited from Destiny's Club in Orlando. Circumstances of the incident remain unclear.

After Stevenson, with a sore knee, scored a career-high 33 points, including a game winning three-pointer as time expired in a February 25, 2008 victory over the New Orleans Hornets, Wizards coach Eddie Jordan described Stevenson by saying, "He's a warrior, man, a true warrior. His confidence is growing, he's making threes, he's just a true pro. This is a man's league and he is man. In the dictionary next to that word there is a picture of DeShawn Stevenson."

At the start of the 2008–09 season, Stevenson struggled and could not bring his offensive game to the level it had attained in 2007. As a result, Stevenson's minutes dipped slightly with the development of second year shooting guard Nick Young and former Maryland standout Juan Dixon.

Dallas Mavericks (2010–2011) 

On February 13, 2010, Stevenson was traded to the Dallas Mavericks along with Caron Butler and Brendan Haywood for Josh Howard, Drew Gooden, James Singleton and Quinton Ross.  Stevenson became the first player in NBA history to wear number 92 on his jersey. Stevenson chose number 92 because he wore number 9 in Orlando and number 2 with Utah and Washington. He used his player option and made $4.15 million during the 2010–11 NBA season. On June 12, 2011, the Mavericks won the NBA championship, defeating the LeBron James-led Miami Heat 105-95 in Game 6 of the NBA Finals. In that game, Stevenson made three of five three-point shots, scoring nine points.

New Jersey Nets (2011–2012) 
On December 23, 2011, Stevenson signed one-year $2.5 million contract with the New Jersey Nets.

Atlanta Hawks (2012–2013) 
On July 11, 2012, the Nets traded Stevenson in a sign-and-trade, along with Jordan Farmar, Jordan Williams, Anthony Morrow, and Johan Petro, to the Atlanta Hawks for Joe Johnson. On August 2, 2013, he was waived by the Hawks.

Stevenson's played his final game on May 1st, 2013 during Game 5 of the Eastern Conference’s 1st Round. The Hawks lost the game 83 - 106 with Stevenson only playing 16 seconds. Stevenson formally announced his retirement three and half years later on December 19, 2016.

NBA career statistics

Regular season 

|-
| style="text-align:left;"| 
| style="text-align:left;"| Utah
| 40 || 2 || 7.3 || .341 || .083 || .684 || .7 || .5 || .3 || .1 || 2.2
|-
| style="text-align:left;"| 
| style="text-align:left;"| Utah
| 67 || 23 || 16.9 || .385 || .080 || .698 || 2.0 || 1.7 || .4 || .4 || 4.9
|-
| style="text-align:left;"| 
| style="text-align:left;"| Utah
| 61 || 8 || 12.5 || .401 || .333 || .691 || 1.4 || .7 || .4 || .1 || 4.6
|-
| style="text-align:left;"| 
| style="text-align:left;"| Utah
| 54 || 54 || 28.0 || .445 || .233 || .669 || 3.3 || 1.7 || .5 || .3 || 11.4
|-
| style="text-align:left;"| 
| style="text-align:left;"| Orlando
| 26 || 24 || 35.9 || .404 || .293 || .690 || 4.6 || 2.5 || .9 || .0 || 11.2
|-
| style="text-align:left;"| 
| style="text-align:left;"| Orlando
| 55 || 27 || 19.8 || .408 || .373 || .554 || 1.9 || 1.3 || .3 || .2 || 7.8
|-
| style="text-align:left;"| 
| style="text-align:left;"| Orlando
| 82 || 82 || 32.3 || .460 || .133 || .744 || 2.9 || 2.0 || .7 || .2 || 11.0
|-
| style="text-align:left;"| 
| style="text-align:left;"| Washington
| 82 || 82 || 29.5 || .461 || .404 || .704 || 2.6 || 2.7 || .8 || .2 || 11.2
|-
| style="text-align:left;"| 
| style="text-align:left;"| Washington
| 82 || 82 || 31.3 || .386 || .383 || .797 || 2.9 || 3.1 || .8 || .2 || 11.2
|-
| style="text-align:left;"| 
| style="text-align:left;"| Washington
| 32 || 25 || 27.7 || .312 || .271 || .533 || 2.4 || 3.1 || .7 || .1 || 6.6
|-
| style="text-align:left;"| 
| style="text-align:left;"| Washington
| 40 || 13 || 15.4 || .282 || .177 || .720 || 1.6 || 1.1 || .3 || .1 || 2.2
|-
| style="text-align:left;"| 
| style="text-align:left;"| Dallas
| 24 || 5 || 11.1 || .283 || .320 || .700 || 1.1 || .5 || .2 || .0 || 2.0
|-
| style="text-align:left;background:#afe6ba;"|  †
| style="text-align:left;"| Dallas
| 72 || 54 || 16.1 || .388 || .378 || .767 || 1.5 || 1.1 || .3 || .1 || 5.3
|-
| style="text-align:left;"| 
| style="text-align:left;"| New Jersey
| 51 || 30 || 18.8 || .285 || .283 || .563 || 2.0 || .8 || .4 || .1 || 2.9
|-
| style="text-align:left;"| 
| style="text-align:left;"| Atlanta
| 56 || 31 || 20.7 || .374 || .364 || .522 || 2.2 || .9 || .5 || .1 || 5.1
|- class="sortbottom"
| style="text-align:center;" colspan="2"| Career
| 824 || 542 || 22.3 || .406 || .340 || .698 || 2.2 || 1.6 || .5 || .2 || 7.2

Playoffs 

|-
| style="text-align:left;"| 2001
| style="text-align:left;"| Utah
| 1 || 0 || 8.0 || .500 || .000 || .000 || 1.0 || .0 || .0 || .0 || 2.0
|-
| style="text-align:left;"| 2003
| style="text-align:left;"| Utah
| 4 || 0 || 9.3 || .400 || .000 || 1.000 || 1.8 || 1.0 || .3 || .0 || 4.5
|-
| style="text-align:left;"| 2007
| style="text-align:left;"| Washington
| 4 || 4 || 30.5 || .196 || .158 || .429 || 2.5 || 1.8 || .5 || .8 || 6.0
|-
| style="text-align:left;"| 2008
| style="text-align:left;"| Washington
| 6 || 6 || 32.7 || .367 || .389 || .889 || 2.2 || 3.0 || 1.0 || .0 || 12.3
|-
| style="text-align:left;"| 2010
| style="text-align:left;"| Dallas
| 2 || 0 || 3.0 || .000 || .000 || .000 || .0 || .0 || .0 || .0 || .0
|-
| style="text-align:left;background:#afe6ba;"|2011†
| style="text-align:left;"| Dallas
| 21 || 18 || 15.8 || .349 || .397 || .750 || .9 || .6 || .5 || .1 || 4.5
|-
| style="text-align:left;"| 2013
| style="text-align:left;"| Atlanta
| 4 || 0 || 11.3 || .600 || .600 || .000 || 2.5 || .3 || .0 || .0 || 2.3
|- class="sortbottom"
| style="text-align:center;" colspan="2"| Career
| 42 || 28 || 17.8 || .327 || .353 || .791 || 1.4 || 1.0 || .5 || .1 || 5.3

See also

References

External links 

 NBA Draft Profile

1981 births
Living people
American men's basketball players
Atlanta Hawks players
Basketball players from California
Big3 players
Dallas Mavericks players
McDonald's High School All-Americans
National Basketball Association high school draftees
New Jersey Nets players
Orlando Magic players
Parade High School All-Americans (boys' basketball)
Shooting guards
Small forwards
Sportspeople from Fresno, California
Utah Jazz draft picks
Utah Jazz players
Washington Wizards players
American men's 3x3 basketball players